The  superyacht Crescent was launched by Lürssen at their yard near Rendsburg. The yacht's exterior design is from Espen Øino (Oeino) and Zuretti Design was responsible for the interior design. She is owned by Caymanese company Black Dragon Minerals LLS. In March 2022, she was detained by Spain as property of Rosneft CEO Igor Sechin, who is sanctioned in connection with 2022 Russian invasion of Ukraine.

Design 
The hull is built out of steel while the superstructure is made out of aluminium with teak laid decks. The yacht is classed by Lloyd's Register and flagged in the Cayman Islands.

Amenities 
Zero speed stabilizers, gym, elevator, swimming pool, movie theatre, tender garage, swimming platform, air conditioning, BBQ, beach club, spa room, underwater lights, beauty salon. There are also two helicopter landing pads, one is on the bow while the other one is located on the top deck. The one on the top deck can be covered by a hangar that is built into the main mast.

Performance
Propulsion is supplied by twin 7,512hp MTU (20V 1163 M84) diesel engines.

See also
 Scheherazade (yacht)
 List of motor yachts by length
 List of yachts built by Lürssen

References

2017 ships
Motor yachts
Ships built in Germany